División de Honor de Béisbol 2016 was the 31st season of the top Spanish baseball league since its establishment. It started on 2 April and finished on 31 July.

Valencia Astros achieved its first title.

Teams

League table

References

External links
Spanish Baseball and Softball Federation website

División de Honor de Béisbol